The Book of the Stars is a novel by Ian Watson published in 1984.

Plot summary
The Book of the Stars is a novel in which the heroine Yaleen dies, and is resurrected by her world's god the Worm.

Reception
Dave Langford reviewed The Book of the Stars for White Dwarf #61, and stated that "All Watson's books are crammed with ideas [...] but this latest trilogy presents them in uniquely digestible form."

Reviews
Review by Chris Morgan (1985) in Fantasy Review, April 1985
Review by Michael R. Collings (1986) in Fantasy Review, May 1986
Review by Don D'Ammassa (1986) in Science Fiction Chronicle, #84 September 1986
Review by Tom Easton (1986) in Analog Science Fiction/Science Fact, October 1986

References

1984 British novels
British science fiction novels
Victor Gollancz Ltd books